Stretch 2 is an extended play by Venezuelan producer Arca. It was released on 6 August 2012 by UNO NYC, following its predecessor Stretch 1 in April.

Composition
Primarily an electronic hip-hop album, Stretch 2 features avant-garde time signatures, warped pitches, and "a kind of post-millennial take on trip-hop with a debt to Aphex Twin", as well as influences from gangsta rap, garage, and new age.

Critical reception

Andrew Ryce of Resident Advisor called Stretch 2 "a mood record, unforgivingly dark and antisocial" and that "Though [her] playful hip-hop vignettes are nice little curios, the album's real eye-openers are when [she] stretches out." Ryce praised the EP's "beautifully tortured production", use of harsh effects, and Arca's "sometimes (unsettlingly) legible" vocals. Birkut of Tiny Mix Tapes called the EP a "remarkable listen that’s constantly negotiating what constitutes fun and fear".

Track listing

References

2012 EPs
Arca (musician) albums
Albums produced by Arca (musician)
Electronic EPs
Hip hop EPs
Trip hop EPs
Sequel albums